Euly Ermitanio (born 30 March 2000) is a Northern Mariana Islands association footballer who currently plays for the Northern Mariana Islands national team.

Youth career
Ermitanio played with Matansa FC as a youth.

College career
For the 2019–2020 season Ermitanio was part of the University of Guam's college soccer team that competes in the Guam Soccer League.

International career
In 2015 Ermitanio was part of the Northern Mariana squad that competed in 2016 AFC U-16 Championship qualification in Laos. The following month he was part of the national squad again for 2016 AFC U-19 Championship qualification in Thailand. He made his senior international debut on 30 June 2016 in a 2017 EAFF E-1 Football Championship match against Taiwan.

References

2000 births
Living people
Association football defenders
Northern Mariana Islands footballers
Northern Mariana Islands international footballers